Serbia Strong is a nickname given to a Serb nationalist and anti-Muslim propaganda music video from the Yugoslav Wars. The song has spread globally amongst far-right groups and the alt-right as a meme which references and advocates for the religious cleansing of Muslims.

The song was originally called "Karadžić, Lead Your Serbs" in reference to the Bosnian Serb military leader and convicted war criminal Radovan Karadžić. It is also known as "God Is a Serb and He Will Protect Us" and "Remove Kebab".

Background 

At the peak of the inter-ethnic wars of the 1990s that broke up Yugoslavia, a song called "Karadžiću, vodi Srbe svoje" was recorded in 1993. The song was composed as a morale boosting tune for Serbian forces during one of the wars. In the video of the song, the tune is performed by four males in Serbian paramilitary uniforms at a location with hilly terrain in the background. Footage of captured Muslim prisoners in wartime Serb-run internment camps are featured in a falsified version of the video which is popular on the Internet.

Parts of the tune attempt to instill a sense of foreboding in their opponents with lines such as "The wolves are coming – beware, Ustashe and Turks". Derogatory terms are used in the song, such as "Ustaše" in reference to ultranationalist and fascist Croat fighters and "Turks" for Bosniaks, with lyrics warning that Serbs, under the leadership of Radovan Karadžić, were coming for them.

The song's content celebrates Serb fighters and the killing of Bosniaks and Croats along with wartime Bosnian Serb leader Radovan Karadžić, who was on 24 March 2016 found guilty of genocide against Bosnian Muslims and crimes against humanity during the Bosnian War (part of the Yugoslav Wars). Karadžić was convicted of "persecution, extermination, deportation, forcible transfer, and murder in connection with his campaign to drive Bosnian Muslims and Croats out of villages claimed by Serb forces". On 20 March 2019, his appeal was rejected and his 40 year sentence was increased to life imprisonment. During the Bosnian War, the song was a marching anthem for nationalist Serb paramilitaries (revived "Chetniks").

The song has been rewritten multiple times in various languages and has retained its militant and anti-Bosnian themes. "Remove Kebab" is the name for the song used by the far-right.

Internet popularity 
Between 2006 and 2008, numerous edits of the video, originally made for the mockumentary TV show Četnovizija, were posted on the Internet, where throughout the mid-2000s many parodies of the meme mocked the video for its aggressively jingoistic nature. Famously, a Turkish internet user parodied the sentiment of Serbian nationalists online, with a satirical incoherent rant that ended with the phrase "remove kebab" being repeated. Although the meme initially intended to parody racism, the original behind the meme was lost once it became common in alt-right discourse.

The meme gained popularity amongst fans of grand strategy computer games by Paradox Interactive, where it referred to the player aiming to defeat the Ottoman Empire or other Islamic nations within the game. The word "kebab" was eventually banned from Paradox Interactive's official forums due to its use by the alt-right and ultranationalists. Shortly after the Christchurch mosque shootings, the meme was also banned from reddit communities based around Paradox Interactive games.

The song's popularity rose over time with radical elements of many right-wing groups within the West. The song is far more famous in the rest of the world than in the Balkans. Novislav Đajić, the song's alleged accordion player, has since become a widespread 4chan meme and is called "Dat Face Soldier" or the image itself as "Remove Kebab". Đajić was convicted in Germany for his part in the murder of 14 people during the war resulting in 5 years imprisonment and deportation to another country following his jail sentence in 1997.

The meme appeared in over 800 threads in the r/The_Donald subreddit and has been made famous by the alt-right.

Academic research found that in a dataset obtained by scraping Know Your Meme in 2018, "Remove Kebab" constituted 1 of every 200 entries per community in a data set sampled for political memes. "Remove Kebab" was particularly common on Gab, a website which "attracts alt-right users, conspiracy theorists, trolls, and high volumes of hate speech".

Christchurch mosque shootings 

Brenton Harrison Tarrant, the Australian gunman in the 2019 mass shootings at the Al Noor Mosque and Linwood Islamic Centre in Christchurch, New Zealand, had the phrase "Remove Kebab" written on one of his weapons. In his manifesto The Great Replacement (named after a far-right theory from France of the same name by writer Renaud Camus), he describes himself as a "part-time kebab removalist". He also livestreamed himself playing the song in his car minutes before the shooting.

Following the shootings, various videos of the song were removed from YouTube, including some with over a million views. After that, users on the online platform re-uploaded the tune, saying that this was in order to "protest censorship". In an interview following the shooting, the main singer of the song, Željko Grmuša, said, "It is terrible what that guy did in New Zealand, of course I condemn that act. I feel sorry for all those innocent people. But he started killing and he would do that no matter what song he listened to."

Notes

References

External links

1993 songs
2010s fads and trends
/pol/ phenomena
Alt-right
Anti-Bosniak sentiment
Anti-Croat sentiment
Bosnian War
Christchurch mosque shootings
Ethnic and religious slurs
Internet memes
Islam-related slurs
Serbian nationalism
Serbian patriotic songs
White nationalist symbols
Yugoslav Wars
Cultural depictions of Radovan Karadžić
Islamophobia in Serbia